Gower Street may refer to:
Gower Street, London
Gower Street (Los Angeles)